Floating capital denotes currency in circulation and assets which can be used for many purposes. It is therefore opposed to "sunk capital", which can be used only for one purpose (for example, a mineshaft).

It comprises the materials and components, constantly supplied in the effecting of all manufactures; currency used for the purpose of transactions, wages and salaries; products in transportation, or in the process of being stored in the prospect of being eventually utilized for this purpose; and the working, circulating capital; rather than that which is fixed as permanently stationary value.

References

Financial capital